Private Aleksandr Matrosov is a 1947 Soviet war drama directed by Leonid Lukov.

Plot 
The film is a dramatization of the life of Alexander Matrosov, a Red Army soldier who was awarded the title of Hero of the Soviet Union for blocking a German machine gun with his body during a 1943 battle, killing him but blocking further fire against other advancing Soviet soldiers.

Cast 
 Anatoliy Ignatyev as Aleksandr Matrosov (as Anatoli Ignatyev)
 Pyotr Konstantinov as Ivan Chumakov
 Konstantin Sorokin as Misha Skvortsov
 Shamsi Kiyamov as Khadyn Abdurakhmanov
 Lavrenti Masokha as Vasya Petrov
 Vladimir Balashov as Kostya Ilyin
 Oleg Zhakov as Captain Vasili Shcherbina
 Mikhail Kuznetsov as Captain Kolosov
 Anatoli Nelidov as Nikolai Gavrilovich
 Faina Ranevskaya as Doctor

References

External links 
 

1947 films
1940s Russian-language films
Soviet war drama films
1940s war drama films
Soviet black-and-white films
1947 drama films